American officials have reported that the late al Qaeda leader Osama bin Laden had numerous bodyguards. They reported that the detainees held in the Guantanamo Bay detention camp included at least 30 of Bin Laden's bodyguards.

How long Osama bin Laden had known an individual before he would trust him to be a bodyguard has been a topic of debate. According to Steve Coll, in his book Ghost Wars,

Historian Andy Worthington, author of The Guantanamo Files, has pointed out that many of those Guantanamo analysts characterized as Osama bin Laden bodyguards had only been in Afghanistan for weeks.

According to Graeme Steven and Rohan Gunaratna, in Counterterrorism: A Reference Handbook, Ali Mohammad, formerly a captain in the Egyptian army, who became an American citizen and a sergeant in the US Special Forces, provided the initial training to the early cohort of Osama bin Laden's bodyguards.

One source of the allegations was Guantanamo captive Mohammed al Qahtani.  
Al Qahtani was believed to be one of the 20 hijackers. The DoD acknowledges he was subjected to "extended interrogation techniques, including two months of sleep-deprivation". Other sources described his treatment as torture. After this, he is reported to have denounced 30 other Guantanamo captives as being bodyguards of Osama Bin Laden.

On April 23, 2010, Benjamin Weiser, writing in The New York Times, reported that a newly released 52-page interrogation summary, published during Ahmed Khalfan Ghailani's civilian trial, revealed new details about the life of an Osama Bin Laden bodyguard.
According to Weiser, the interrogation summary asserted that Ghailani said he was told Bin Laden had personally requested he agree to serve as one of his bodyguards; that he was asked twice to be a bodyguard; and that he did not believe bin Laden had actually personally requested him.
According to Weiser the interrogation summary asserted Ghailani had served as a bodyguard for approximately one year, and he was one of approximately fifteen bodyguards.
According to Weiser the interrogation summary asserted that Ghailani was armed with an AK-47, and that during that year he spoke with Bin Laden numerous times.
According to Weiser the interrogation summary asserted that Ghailani and several other individuals who served with him as bodyguards were among those who later became hijackers in the September 11 attacks.

References

External links
 Who Are the Remaining Prisoners in Guantánamo? Part One: The “Dirty Thirty”

Bodyguard
Laden